Clarence Leonard Hayes (November 14, 1908 – March 13, 1972) was an American jazz vocalist and banjo player.

Early life
Hayes was born in Caney, Kansas, on November 14, 1908. As a child, he learned the drums, then switched to guitar and banjo.

Later life and career
Hayes was part of a vaudeville troupe in the Midwest after 1923, and lived in San Francisco from 1927. He became more popular in the 1930s through radio and club performances. From 1938 to 1940 he played in a big band led by Lu Watters, after which he spent a decade with the Yerba Buena Jazz Band, playing rhythm banjo and, on occasion, drums. He spent almost all of the 1950s singing with Bob Scobey's band.

In the 1960s he led his own bands, which also recorded for various labels. He also played with the Firehouse Five Plus Two, Turk Murphy, and a group that evolved into the World's Greatest Jazz Band. As a vocalist, "Hayes was noted for his straightforward singing of ballads and his flamboyant delivery of livelier songs." He died in San Francisco on March 13, 1972.

Discography
 Clancy Hayes and His Washboard Five (Down Home, 1951)
 Cakewalk to Lindy Hop (Columbia, 1956)
 Clancy Hayes Sings (Verve, 1957)
 Clancy Hayes' Dixieland Band (Audio Fidelity, 1960)
 Swingin' Minstrel (Good Time Jazz, 1963)
 Oh! By Jingo (Delmark, 1964)
 Happy Melodies (ABC-Paramount, 1965)
 Live at Earthquake McGoon's (ABC-Paramount, 1966)
 More of Manassas (Fat Cat Jazz, 1969)
 Mr. Hayes Goes to Washington (Clanco, 1972)
 Satchel of Song (San Francisco Traditional Jazz Foundation, 2001)

With Bob Scobey
 The San Francisco Jazz of Bob Scobey (Verve, 1957)
 Between 18th and 19th on Any Street (RCA Victor, 1957)
 Beauty and the Beat (RCA Victor, 1957)
 Direct from San Francisco! (Good Time Jazz, 1957)
 Scobey & Clancy Raid the Juke Box (California, 1958)
 College Classics (RCA Victor, 1958)

References

External links
Lu Watters and His World Famous Yerba Buena Jazz Band, featuring a live performance by Clancy Hayes.
Clancy Hayes Archive.

1908 births
1972 deaths
People from Parsons, Kansas
People from Caney, Kansas
American jazz singers
American jazz banjoists
American jazz guitarists
Singers from Kansas
20th-century American singers
20th-century American guitarists
Guitarists from Kansas
American male guitarists
20th-century American male musicians
American male jazz musicians
World's Greatest Jazz Band members
Yerba Buena Jazz Band members